Kasperek is a Polish surname. Notable people with the surname include:

 Dick Kasperek (born 1943), American football player
 Leigh Kasperek (born 1992), Scottish cricketer
 Kazimierz J. Kasperek (1916–2008), Polish naval officer

Polish-language surnames